The following is a list of Royal Fleet Auxiliary ship names by name in alphabetical order, both past and present.  Many of the names have been re-used over the years and thus represent more than one ship.



A
 RFA Abadol
 RFA Abbeydale
 RFA Advice
 RFA Agile
RFA Airsprite
 RFA Aldersdale
 RFA Allegiance
 RFA Amherst
 RFA Anchorite
 RFA Antic
 RFA Appleleaf
 RFA Aquarius
 RFA Argo
 RFA Argus
 RFA Arndale
 RFA Aro
 RFA Ashleaf
 RFA Aspenleaf
 RFA Attendant

B
 RFA Bacchus
 RFA Barkol
 RFA Battersol
 RFA Bayleaf
 RFA Bayol
 RFA Beechleaf
 RFA Belgol
 RFA Berbice
 RFA Berta
 RFA Birchleaf
 RFA Birchol
 RFA Bishopdale
 RFA Bison
 RFA Blackol
 RFA Black Ranger
 RFA Black Rover
 RFA Blackstone
 RFA Blue Ranger
 RFA Blue Rover
 RFA Boardale
 RFA Bornol
 RFA Boxleaf
 RFA Boxol
 RFA Brambleleaf
 RFA Briarleaf
 RFA British Beacon
 RFA British Lantern
 RFA British Lady
 RFA British Light
 RFA British Star
 RFA Brown Ranger
 RFA Broomdale
 RFA Burma
 RFA Bustler

C
 RFA C8
 RFA C10
 RFA C11
 RFA C85
 RFA C614
 RFA C615
 RFA C616
 RFA C617
 RFA C619
 RFA C620
 RFA C621
 RFA C623
 RFA C624
 RFA C625
 RFA C633
 RFA C641
 RFA C642
 RFA C647
 RFA C648
 RFA C653
 RFA Cairndale
 RFA Califol
 RFA Canning
 RFA Cardigan Bay
 RFA Carol
 RFA Cautious
 RFA Cederdale
 RFA Cedarol
 RFA Celerol
 RFA Chattenden
 RFA Cherryleaf
 RFA City of Oxford
 RFA Crenella
 RFA Creosol
 RFA Cyclone

D
 RFA Danmark
 RFA Dapper
 RFA Darkdale
 RFA Delphinula
 RFA Demeter
 RFA Denbydale
 RFA Derwentdale
 RFA Dewdale
 RFA Diligence
 RFA Dingledale
 RFA Dinsdale
 RFA Discovery I
 RFA Discovery II
 RFA Dispenser
 RFA Distol
 RFA Dockleaf
 RFA Dredgol

E
 RFA Eaglesdale
 RFA Earner
 RFA Easedale
 RFA Ebonol
 RFA Echodale
 RFA Eddybay
 RFA Eddybeach
 RFA Eddycliff
 RFA Eddycove
 RFA Eddycreek
 RFA Eddyfirth
 RFA Eddymull
 RFA Eddyness
 RFA Eddyreef
 RFA Eddyrock
 RFA Elderol
 RFA Elmleaf
 RFA Elmol
 RFA Empire Ace
 RFA Empire Clyde
 RFA Empire Demon
 RFA Empire Fred
 RFA Empire Gull
 RFA Empire Netta
 RFA Empire Plane
 RFA Empire Rita
 RFA Empire Rosa
 RFA Empire Salvage
 RFA Empire Zona
 RFA Encore
 RFA Enforcer
 RFA Engadine
 RFA Ennerdale
 RFA Envoy
 RFA Eppingdale

F
 RFA Fernleaf
 RFA Ferol
 RFA Fidget
 RFA Fort Austin
 RFA Fort Beauharnois
 RFA Fort Charlotte
 RFA Fort Constantine
 RFA Fort Dunvegan
 RFA Fort Duquesne
 RFA Fort George
 RFA Fort Grange
 RFA Fort Langley
 RFA Fort Rosalie
 RFA Fort Sandusky
 RFA Fort Victoria
 RFA Fortol
 RFA Francol
 RFA Freshbrook
 RFA Freshburn
 RFA Freshener
 RFA Freshet
 RFA Freshford
 RFA Freshlake
 RFA Freshmere
 RFA Freshpond
 RFA Freshpool
 RFA Freshtarn
 RFA Freshwater
 RFA Freshwell

G
 RFA Gold Ranger
 RFA Gold Rover
 RFA Greenol
 RFA Green Ranger
 RFA Green Rover
 RFA Grey Ranger
 RFA Grey Rover
 RFA Growler
 RFA Gypol

H
 RFA Hebe
 RFA Hickorol
 RFA Holdfast
 RFA Hollyleaf
 RFA Hughli
 RFA Hungerford
 RFA Huntball

I
 RFA Industry
 RFA Ingeborg
 RFA Innisfree
 RFA Innisinver
 RFA Innisjura
 RFA Innisshannon
 RFA Innissulva
 RFA Innistrahull
 RFA Isla

J
 RFA Jaunty

K
 RFA Kharki
 RFA Kimmerol
 RFA Kinbrace
 RFA Kingarth
 RFA King Salvor
 RFA Kurumba

L
 RFA Larchol
 RFA Largs Bay
 RFA Laurelleaf
 RFA Limeleaf
 RFA Limol
 RFA Limpet
 RFA Lucia
 RFA Lucigen
 RFA Lyme Bay
 RFA Lyness

M
 RFA Maine
 RFA Mapleleaf
 RFA Mariner
 RFA Mediator
 RFA Melita
 RFA Mercedes
 RFA Messenger
 RFA Mixol
 RFA Mollusc
 RFA Montenol
 RFA Mounts Bay

N
 RFA Nasprite
 RFA Nigeria
 RFA Nimble
 RFA Nora
 RFA Northmark
 RFA Nucula

O
 RFA Oakleaf
 RFA Oakol
 RFA Ocean Salvor
 RFA Olaf
 RFA Olalla
 RFA Olbury
 RFA Olcades
 RFA Oleander
 RFA Oleary
 RFA Oleaster
 RFA Oletta
 RFA Olga
 RFA Oligarch
 RFA Olinda
 RFA Oliphant
 RFA Olivet
 RFA Oliver
 RFA Olmeda
 RFA Olmos
 RFA Olna
 RFA Olwen
 RFA Olympia
 RFA Olynthus
 RFA Orangeleaf

P
 RFA Palmleaf
 RFA Palmol
 RFA Pearleaf
 RFA Persol
 RFA Perthshire
 RFA Petrella
 RFA Petrobus
 RFA Petroleum
 RFA Petrelia
 RFA Petronel
 RFA Philol
 RFA Plumleaf
 RFA Polavon
 RFA Polgowan
 RFA Polmont
 RFA Polshannon
 RFA Prestol
 RFA Prince Salvor
 RFA Princetown
 RFA Prosperous
 RFA Purfol

Q

R
 RFA Racer
 RFA Rangol
 RFA Rapidol
 RFA Red Dragon
 RFA Regent
 RFA Reindeer
 RFA Reliance
 RFA Reliant
 RFA Resource
 RFA Resurgent
 RFA Retainer
 RFA Reward
 RFA Rippledyke
 RFA Robert Dundas
 RFA Robert Middleton
 RFA Roseleaf
 RFA Rowanol
 RFA Rumol
 RFA Ruthenia

S
 RFA Salviking
 RFA Salvage Duke
 RFA Salvalour
 RFA Salventure
 RFA Salvestor
 RFA Salvictor
 RFA Salvigil
 RFA Salviola
 RFA Samsonia
 RFA Santa Margherita
 RFA Saucy
 RFA Saxol
 RFA Scotol
 RFA Scottish American
 RFA Sea Centurion
 RFA Sea Chieftain
 RFA Sea Crusader
 RFA Sea Salvor
 RFA Seafox
 RFA Serbol
 RFA Servitor
 RFA Silverol
 RFA Sir Bedivere
 RFA Sir Caradoc
 RFA Sir Galahad
 RFA Sir Geraint
 RFA Sir Lamorak
 RFA Sir Lancelot
 RFA Sir Percivale
 RFA Sir Tristram
 RFA Slavol
 RFA Sobo
 RFA Sokoto
 RFA Somersby
 RFA Sotol
 RFA Spa
 RFA Spabeck
 RFA Spabrook
 RFA Spaburn
 RFA Spalake
 RFA Spapool
 RFA Sparkler
 RFA Sprucol
 RFA Steadfast
 RFA Stromness
 RFA Succour
 RFA Sunhill
 RFA Surf Patrol
 RFA Surf Pilot
 RFA Surf Pioneer
 RFA Swin

T
 RFA Tarakol
 RFA Tarbatness
 RFA Teakol
 RFA Texol
 RFA Thermol
 RFA Thistle
 RFA Thornol
 RFA Thrush
 RFA Tide Austral
 RFA Tideflow
 RFA Tideforce
 RFA Tidepool
 RFA Tiderace
 RFA Tiderange
 RFA Tidereach
 RFA Tidespring
 RFA Tidesurge
 RFA Trefoil
 RFA Trinol
 RFA Turmoil
 RFA Typhoon

U
 RFA Uplifter

V
 RFA Victorious
 RFA Vineleaf
 RFA Viscol
 RFA Vitol
 RFA Volunteer

W
 RFA War Afridi
 RFA War Bahadur
 RFA War Bharata
 RFA War Brahmin
 RFA War Diwan
 RFA War Hindoo
 RFA War Krishna
 RFA War Methar
 RFA War Nawab
 RFA War Nizam
 RFA War Pathan
 RFA War Pindari
 RFA War Sepoy
 RFA War Sirdar
 RFA War Sudra
 RFA Warden
 RFA Wave Baron
 RFA Wave Chief
 RFA Wave Commander
 RFA Wave Conqueror
 RFA Wave Duke
 RFA Wave Emperor
 RFA Wave Governor
 RFA Wave King
 RFA Wave Knight
 RFA Wave Laird
 RFA Wave Liberator
 RFA Wave Master
 RFA Wave Monarch
 RFA Wave Premier
 RFA Wave Prince
 RFA Wave Protector
 RFA Wave Regent
 RFA Wave Ruler
 RFA Wave Sovereign
 RFA Wave Victor
 RFA William Scoresby

X

Y

Z

Royal Fleet Auxiliary names
Royal Fleet Auxiliary